The following is a timeline of the history of the city of Port Said, Egypt.

Prior to 20th century

 1859
 Port Said founded.
 Population: 150.
 1861 - Population: 4,000.
 1863 - Sweet Water Canal built.
 1869
 Lighthouse of Port Said begins operating.
 November: Suez Canal opens.
 1870 - Coal heaving porters guild established.
 1870s - Anti-European unrest.
 1881 - Abbas Mosque commissioned (built later).
 1883 - Population: 17,000.
 1895 - Headquarter of the Suez Canal Authority in Port Said built.
 1899 - De Lesseps statue unveiled on Jetee Ouest (pier).

20th century

 1904 - Cairo-Port Said railway begins operating.
 1917 - Russian battleship Peresvet sinks offshore.
 1920 - Al-Masry Sporting Club formed.
 1926
 Port Fouad founded on opposite side of Suez Canal.
  established.
 1947 - Population: 177,703.
 1955 - Port Said Stadium opens.
 1956
 5 November: British and French forces arrive during Suez Crisis.
 23 December: British and French troops depart.
 December: Moorhouse Affair.
 1960 - Population: 244,000.
 1967 - After Israeli forces occupy Sinai Peninsula, some residents begin to flee city.
 1974 - Population: 342,000.
 1976
 Suez Canal University established.
 Port Said declared a duty-free port.
 1992 - Population: 460,000 (estimate).
 1995 - Museum of Modern Art opens.
 1998 - History Gardens laid out.
 1999 - Port Said Hall (arena) opens.

21st century

 2004
 Suez Canal Container Terminal begins operating.
 Misr Public Library inaugurated.
 2005 - Port Said International School opens.
 2008
 December: 2008 Arab Futsal Championship held.
 Population: 588,938.
 2010
 Port Said University established.
 Population: 603,787.
 2012 - 1 February: Port Said Stadium riot.
 2013
 26 January: Unrest begins after verdict of stadium riot.
 27 January: Anti-Morsi protest.
 17–19 February: Labor strike, protest.
 March: Unrest.
 2017 - Population: 749,371 (urban agglomeration).

See also
 History of Port Said
 Timelines of other cities in Egypt: Alexandria, Cairo

References

This article incorporates information from the Spanish Wikipedia.

External links

 Digital Public Library of America. Items related to Port Said, various dates

Port Said
Port Said
Port Said
Port Said
Years in Egypt